Marek Čech may refer to:

Marek Čech (Slovak footballer) (born 1983), retired Slovak footballer
Marek Čech (Czech footballer) (born 1976), Czech international football goalkeeper

See also
Čech (surname)